Newby Head, Newby Head Farm or Newby Head Inn is part of the Beresford Estate and was a popular drovers' inn in North Yorkshire, England. Now a farmhouse, it stands at the top of Newby Head Pass on the B6255 road between Ingleton and Hawes.

Drover's Inn
The buildings at Newby Head were a drovers' inn until 1919. There was plenty of custom from the drovers bringing sheep and cattle to and from Scotland. The land around Newby Head is mostly peat and limestone and has the source of the River Ribble bubbling out of it. Newby Head Inn was an alternative to the renowned drovers inn and weekly market at Gearstones selling meat, flour, animals and vegetables just a couple of miles down the road.

Winters are very harsh in the Yorkshire Dales. In the past winters the RAF was drafted in to drop hay and food supplies for the farmers and animals. There are also signs of now-abandoned settlements around Newby Head.

The inn at Newby Head was a drovers' inn and roadside inn for travellers on the Richmond to Lancaster Turnpike road. There drovers, packmen and other travellers called in for a drink and to stay the night. The lodgings were basic and not only were rooms shared, but beds were shared as well as was often the custom of the past centuries. In January 1843, an inquest was held at Newby Head Inn by the Skipton coroner Thomas Brown. Isaac Mason, a native of Kendal, had been found dead in bed. According to the landlord and the person who shared the bed, he went downstairs to get a candle for light. When he returned he found Isaac Mason dead. The verdict was death by the 'visitation of God'.

Thomas Guy was innkeeper in 1821. Edmund Thistlethwaite was landlord in 1841 and by 1851 John Swinbank had taken over. In 1905 the landlord changed from Christopher Swinback to Simeon Parker. It was one of the outlying inns which the magistrates were keen to close around the turn of the century mainly because it was too far out from the towns to supervise and they saw no real need for it. It was always a farm and after its closure as an inn in 1919 it returned to full-time farming.

Newby Head Pass 
Newby Head Pass is an upland pass situated on the top section of the B6255 between Hawes and Ingleton, North Yorkshire in England. Newby Head Pass was named after the Drovers Inn at Newby Head at the top of the Pass.

References

External links

 Rambles by the Ribble, 1864
 Walks in Yorkshire: I. in the North West, II. in the North East. (With maps.), 1866

Landforms of North Yorkshire
Mountain passes of England
Craven District